Krisztián Kuti (born 4 December 1992) is a Hungarian football right back who plays for Ceglédi VSE.

Club Statistic

External links
 
 

1992 births
Living people
People from Debrecen
Hungarian footballers
Association football defenders
Létavértes SC players
Debreceni VSC players
Cigánd SE players
Nemzeti Bajnokság I players